Muallim İsmail Hakkı Bey (born in 1865-1927 in Istanbul, Turkey) was a Turkish composer and musician during the Ottoman Empire. He is also known for writing many of today's popular mehter marches, such as Ceddin Deden

References

1865 births
Year of death missing
Turkish composers